Iryna Aliyeva, née Iryna Kindzerska (born 13 June 1991), is a Ukrainian-born Azerbaijani judoka. In 2021, she won one of the bronze medals in the women's +78 kg event at the 2020 Summer Olympics held in Tokyo, Japan. She is also a two-time medalist at the European Judo Championships and a bronze medalist at the 2017 World Judo Championships and the 2019 European Games.

Career
She competed at the 2012 Summer Olympics in the +78 kg event, for Ukraine.

Some references point to the fact that Kindzerska was born in Bakota, Ukraine. The little town of Bakota has officially disappeared in 1981 as it was submerged by waters of the Dniester Reservoir. In 2016, Kindzerska married an Azerbaijani athlete. They moved to Azerbaijan a year later and she has since represented this country.  In 2017, she won a bronze medal at the World Championship, defeating Tessie Savelkouls in the bronze medal match.

She won bronze at the 2019 European Games.

In 2021, she won the silver medal in her event at the 2021 Judo World Masters held in Doha, Qatar.

References

External links
 

1991 births
Living people
People from Kamianets-Podilskyi
Ukrainian female judoka
Olympic judoka of Ukraine
Judoka at the 2012 Summer Olympics
Azerbaijani female judoka
Ukrainian emigrants to Azerbaijan
Naturalized citizens of Azerbaijan
European Games competitors for Ukraine
Judoka at the 2015 European Games
Judoka at the 2019 European Games
European Games medalists in judo
European Games bronze medalists for Azerbaijan
Judoka at the 2020 Summer Olympics
Medalists at the 2020 Summer Olympics
Olympic medalists in judo
Olympic bronze medalists for Azerbaijan
Olympic judoka of Azerbaijan
Sportspeople from Khmelnytskyi Oblast